St. Paul's Matriculation Higher Secondary School is an all-boys Catholic secondary school in Neyveli, Tamil Nadu, India.

The school was founded in 1972 by Rev. Fr. John Duraisamy, who requested the Archbishop of Pondy Cuddalore to open an all-boys English-language school in Neyveli. St.Paul's Matriculation Higher Secondary School is a brother institution of St.Joseph's of Cluny, Neyveli. St.Joseph's of Cluny started on 15 July 1968, swelled into 2300 students by 1975, with only VII standards. The segregation of the boys in a separate school was very keenly felt, and the time, in the providence of God, was not yet ripe. The challenge of opening this boys' school was accepted by the then Archbishop of Pondicherry and Cuddalore on 29 June 1977 and was inaugurated by MR. Radhakrishnan, the Deputy Chief Personnel Manager of Neyveli Lignite Corporation. Since then the school has grown into a Higher Secondary School with a strength of more than 3800 students.

Uniform
Students of this school are required to wear a uniform consisting of a 
 White shirt
 Maroon shorts
 Maroon socks
 Black shoes
 Maroon tie

Campus and surrounding area
The school is located in Block-4 in Neyveli, 2 km from the city's central bus stand. It is connected by the city's bus services and the school's own buses. Students at this school come from Vadalur, Kurinjipadi, Vriddhachalam, Mandharakuppam, Panruti and surrounding areas.

The school has an auditorium used for events, competitions, and exams, as well as a playground.

Curriculum
The school is recognised by the Government of Tamil Nadu.  The curriculum is Matriculation until class 10. Classes 11 and 12 follow the state board curriculum. Tamil and Hindi are offered as second languages. (Tamil Nadu follows the two-language formula, where besides English students opt for a second language subject).

Notable alumni

References

External links
 Official website

Boys' schools in India
Catholic secondary schools in India
Christian schools in Tamil Nadu
High schools and secondary schools in Tamil Nadu
Education in Cuddalore district
Educational institutions established in 1972
1972 establishments in Tamil Nadu